1956 was the 57th season of County Championship cricket in England. It is memorable for the performances of Jim Laker, especially his unique feat in taking a world record 19 wickets in the Old Trafford Test Match. He took a total of 46 wickets in the five Tests, a record in an England-Australia series. In May, he had taken all ten wickets in the Australian first innings in their match against Surrey, assisting Surrey to become the first county side since 1912 to defeat the Australians. Surrey won the County Championship for the fifth successive year to create a new record of consecutive titles won by one county.

Honours
County Championship – Surrey
Minor Counties Championship – Kent II
Wisden – Dennis Brookes, Jim Burke, Malcolm Hilton, Gil Langley, Peter Richardson

Test series

County Championship

Leading batsmen
Ken Mackay topped the averages with 1103 runs @ 52.52

Leading bowlers
Tony Lock topped the averages with 155 wickets @ 12.46

References

Annual reviews
 Playfair Cricket Annual 1957
 Wisden Cricketers' Almanack 1957

Further reading
 Bill Frindall, The Wisden Book of Test Cricket 1877-1978, Wisden, 1979
 Chris Harte, A History of Australian Cricket, Andre Deutsch, 1993
 Ray Robinson, On Top Down Under, Cassell, 1975

External links
 CricketArchive – season summary

1956 in English cricket
English cricket seasons in the 20th century